Thrive Music is a United States-based record label founded in Los Angeles, California, by music industry entrepreneur, Ricardo Vinas.

History
Thrive Records was founded in 1997  by electronic music trailblazer Ricardo Vinas, as a joint venture with Sire/Warner Bros. Records—the label founded by legendary A&R man Seymour Stein. Vinas credits Stein as the most influential mentor in his career. During Thrive Records first four years, Vinas worked closely with the revered record executive responsible for discovering Madonna, Depeche Mode, and The Ramones.

Thrive hit the ground running with the release of the soundtrack album for the most talked about independent film of 1998, Darren Aronofsky’s Pi (Sundance Film Festival Best Director Award Winner), and launching the premiere DJ mix series, Global Underground. The upstart label immediately had in its roster some of the most up and coming artists in electronic music, including Paul Oakenfold and Deep Dish.

Thrive Records distributed Oakenfold’s label Perfecto Records for a decade. Paul Oakenfold received a 2006 Grammy nomination for his Thrive Records album, Creamfields (2006).

Deep Dish delivered their most successful and Grammy nominated album, George Is On (2005), during their time at Thrive Records. George Is On spun Deep Dish’s biggest selling singles, "Flashdance", "Say Hello", and their collaboration with Stevie Nicks on a dance version of the Fleetwood Mac classic, "Dreams". Thrive Records' artist roster has included the critically acclaimed Roni Size, A-Trak, former Underworld member Darren Emerson, Mark Ronson, Duck Sauce, Sander Kleinenberg, Josh Wink, Ferry Corsten, and Steve Aoki. The Thrive/Dim Mak single, "I’m In The House" featuring will.i.am, was Aoki's only American Top 40 radio crossover single until 2017.

The genre defining debut albums from Steve Aoki, Pillow Face and His Airplane Chronicles (2008), and A-Trak's Infinity+1 (2009), were both released by Thrive Records.

Thrive Records was active in the film soundtrack arena. In addition to Pi, Thrive Records released the soundtrack albums for the Oscar nominated and highly acclaimed Christopher Nolan film, Memento, the groundbreaking Requiem For a Dream directed by Darren Aronofsky.

Thrive Records dabbled in alternative music after signing Foo Fighter's drummer, Taylor Hawkins, and his solo band, The Coattail Riders.

The label was home to many of today's top EDM executives including former Thrive Records GM Lee Kurisu (Dim Mak Records President), and A&R executives Peter Torres and David Dann (Mind of a Genius Records GM, and Founder).

Thrive Pictures was the film and television division for Thrive Records run by Hollywood film executive Bryan Brucks.

Distribution
WEA Distribution was Thrive Records distributor from 1997 until 2000. Thrive Records moved to RED Distribution/Sony Music in 2001 and ranked consistently as one of RED's top performing labels. Thrive Records provided North American distribution for several iconic European dance labels, including Perfecto Records, Renaissance Recordings, and Global Underground.

Thrive Music
After a successful 15-year run with Thrive Records, Ricardo Vinas launched Thrive Music in 2015 with distribution through Sony Music. Thrive Music has released successful projects from EDM mainstays like Moby, Nicky Romero, Cheat Codes, and Dimitri Vegas & Like Mike. The label has assembled an artist roster that also includes newcomers like SAYMYNAME, and the 2017 Grammy nominated Lipless, Cazztek, Sick Individuals, Dropout, 4B, Hunter Siegel, Myon, and Madison Mars.

Thrive Music artists are featured in multiple television shows, video games, films, and multi-media ad campaigns. In 2017 those include Despicable Me 3 (trailer), Mountain Dew, So You Think You Can Dance, and Dancing With The Stars.

Artists
 
 4B
 Air
 Alphalove
 Amanda Scheer Demme
 Amba Shepherd
 Anevo
 Aspyer
 ATLiens
 A-Trak
 Bad Boy Bill
 Bailo
 Bishøp
 Bishu
 BRKLYN
 Convex
 Cazztek
 Cheat Codes
 Clint Mansell
 Danny Tenaglia
 Darren Emerson
 Dave Seaman
 Deep Dish
 Delaney Jane
 Dimitri Vegas & Like Mike
 Dirty Audio
 DJ Dan
 DJ Skribble
 Dropout
 Duck Sauce
 Duelle
 Duke & Jones
 Fatboy Slim
 Fareoh
 Ferry Corsten
 Fight Clvb
 Fred Falke
 Funky Craig
 Gazzo
Greencoast
 Henrix
 Heren
 Hernan Cattaneo
 Holly
 Hunter Siegel
 HVRCRFT
 Hyper
 Infusion
 Jack Trades
 James Zabiela
 Jaycen A'mour
 Jayceeoh
 J. WORRA
 John Digweed
 Johnny Vicious
 Jason Nevins
 Joe Ghost
 Josh Wink
 Jvst Say Yes
 KANDY
 Karra
 Ken Loi
 KLOUD
 LA Riots
 Landis
 Lipless
 Louis Vivet
 Loveless
 Lunde Bros.
 Madison Mars
 Madnap
 Mahalo
 Manse
 Mark Ronson
 Moby
 Moore Kismet
 Morten
 Myon
 NERVO
 Nic Fanciulli
 Nicky Romero
 NuKid
 O Mer
 Paul Oakenfold
 Poet Name Life
 Ravell
 Ray Volpe
 Reez
 Restless Modern
 RBYN
 Remmi
 Restless Modern
 Richard Vission
 Ricky Remedy
 Riggi & Piros
 Riot Ten
 Rome In Silver 
 Roni Size
 Ryos
 Sagan
 Sander Kleinenberg
 Sandra Collins
 Sasha
 SAYMYNAME
 Seb Fontaine
 Shaylen
 Sick Individuals
 Snugs
 Speaker of the House
 Steve Aoki
 Stryker
 Syzz
 Tamra Keenan
 Taylor Hawkins and the Coattail Riders
 The Ready Set
 Thomas Bangalter
 Tim Deluxe
 Tommie Sunshine
 Tony Okungbowa
 Tony Romera
 Trivecta
 Twofold
 tyDi
 Unknown Brain
 Vanillaz
 Vic Latino
 WeAreTreo
 YDG

Compilations
Thrive Records launched and marketed some of the most successful dance compilation series in the United States:

See also
 List of record labels

References

External links
 
 Thrive Records at Discogs

American record labels
Alternative rock record labels
Electronic music record labels
Record labels established in 1997